Kalyanmoy Deb is an Indian computer scientist. Deb is the Herman E. & Ruth J. Koenig Endowed Chair in Communication Systems in the Department of Electrical and Computing Engineering at Michigan State University. Deb is also a professor in the Department of Computer Science and Engineering and the Department of Mechanical Engineering at Michigan State University.

Deb established the Kanpur Genetic Algorithms Laboratory at IIT Kanpur in 1997 and the Computational Optimization and Innovation (COIN) Laboratory at Michigan State in 2013. In 2001, Wiley published a textbook written by Deb titled Multi-Objective Optimization using Evolutionary Algorithms as part of its series titled "Systems and Optimization". In an analysis of the network of authors in the academic field of evolutionary computation by Carlos Cotta and Juan-Julián Merelo, Deb was identified as one of the most central authors in the community and was designated as a "sociometric superstar" of the field. Deb has several honors, including the Shanti Swarup Bhatnagar award in engineering sciences (2005), the Thomson Citation Laureate award for his highly cited research in computer science (1996–2005), and the MCDM Edgeworth-Pareto Award for a record of creativity to the extent that the field of multiple-criteria decision making would not exist in its current form in 2008. Deb has been awarded the Infosys Prize in Engineering and Computer Science from Infosys Limited, Bangalore, India for his contributions to evolutionary multi-objective optimization, which have led to "advances in non-linear constraints, decision uncertainty, programming and numerical methods, computational efficiency of large-scale problems, and optimization algorithms." He is also a recipient of the 2012 TWAS Prize from the World Academy of Sciences.

Background and career
Deb received his B.Tech. in Mechanical Engineering (1985) from IIT Kharagpur and his MS (1989) and PhD (1991) in Engineering Mechanics from the University of Alabama. His PhD advisor was David E. Goldberg, and his PhD thesis was titled Binary and Floating-Point Function Optimization using Messy Genetic Algorithms. From 1991 to 1992 he was a postdoc at UIUC. In 1993, he became a professor of mechanical engineering at IIT Kanpur, where he went on to hold the Deva Raj Endowed Chair (2007–2010) and the Gurmukh and Veena Mehta Endowed Chair (2011–2013). For his next position, he left for the Michigan State University, where has been the Herman E. & Ruth J. Koenig Endowed Chair since 2013.

Research

NSGA
Deb is a highly cited researcher, with 138,000+ Google Scholar citations and an h-index of 116. A large fraction of his citations come from his work on nondominated-sorting genetic algorithms for multiobjective optimization. In 1994, Deb and coauthor Nidamarthi Srinivas introduced one of the first nondominated-sorting genetic algorithms, which they termed "NSGA".

NSGA-II
In 2002, Deb and coauthors Amrit Pratap, Sameer Agarwal, and T.A.M.T. Meyarivan introduced a notion of crowding distance for an individual, which "calculates a measure of how close an individual is to its neighbors." They also introduced a faster way to implement nondominated sorting, by for every individual keeping track of which other individuals it strictly dominates. By incorporating crowding distance, elitism, and the faster implementation of nondominated sorting into the original NSGA, Deb and his coauthors modified the original NSGA and made it faster and more reliable. They termed this modification "NSGA-II". According to the Web of Science Core Collection database, this paper was the first paper solely by Indian authors to have more than 5,000 citations.

NSGA-III
In 2013, Deb and coauthor Himanshu Jain proposed a modification of NSGA-II for solving many-objective optimization problems with 10+ objectives. They termed this modification "NSGA-III".

Awards

Humboldt Fellow, AvH, Germany (1998)
Friedrich Wilhelm Bessel Award, AvH, Germany (2003)
Shanti Swarup Bhatnagar (2005)
Finnish Distinguished Professor (FiDiPro) (2007–2009)
Edgeworth-Pareto Award (2008)
Infosys Awards (2010)
J.C.Bose National Fellow (2011)
IEEE Fellow (2011)
CajAstur "Mamdani" Prize, European Soft Computing Center (2011)
The World Academy of Sciences (2012)
Honorary Doctorate Degree, Univ. of Jyvaskyla, Finland (2013)
ACM Fellow (2022)

Notes

References

External links
Kalyanmoy Deb: Current Classic Paper in Engineering Podcast (November, 2010)
Interview with Deb by ESI Special Topics

Year of birth missing (living people)
Living people
Michigan State University faculty
Fellows of the Indian Academy of Sciences
Scientists from Tripura
TWAS laureates
Recipients of the Shanti Swarup Bhatnagar Award in Engineering Science
Fellows of the Association for Computing Machinery